Košiše is a small dispersed settlement above Mekinje in the Municipality of Kamnik in the Upper Carniola region of Slovenia. The settlement includes the hamlet of Ravne.

References

External links

Košiše on Geopedia

Populated places in the Municipality of Kamnik